Jean Marie Twenge (born August 24, 1971) is an American psychologist researching generational differences, including work values, life goals, and speed of development. She is a professor of psychology at San Diego State University, author, consultant, and public speaker. She has examined generational differences in work attitudes, life goals, developmental speed, sexual behavior, and religious commitment.

She is also known for her books iGen, Generation Me and The Narcissism Epidemic. In the September 2017 issue of The Atlantic, Twenge argued that smartphones were the most likely cause behind the sudden increases in mental health issues among teens after 2012. Twenge co-authored a 2017 corpus linguistics analysis that said that George Carlin's "seven dirty words you can't say on television" were used 28 times more frequently in 2008 than in 1950 in the texts at Google Books. Twenge said the increase is due to the dominance of self over social conventions.

Education
Twenge was educated at the University of Chicago and the University of Michigan where she was awarded a PhD in 1998 for a meta-analysis of assertiveness, sociability and anxiety.

Career and research 
Twenge's research investigates issues around generations, personality, social psychology and gender roles.

In 2017, Twenge wrote an article in The Atlantic asking "Have smartphones destroyed a generation?" which presented findings from her book iGen. Sarah Rose Cavanagh in Psychology Today disagreed with Twenge's negative view, arguing that Twenge had ignored data supporting positive findings, presented correlation as causation, over-generalized and not taken social contexts into account. Twenge responded to Cavanagh in the same publication, citing a meta-analysis and controlled experiments in support of her theories, and stating that her article and book had also highlighted positive trends. She also denied that she was outright opposed to technology: "Smartphone or internet use of up to an hour or two a day is not linked with mental health issues or unhappiness... It's two hours a day and beyond that that's the issue."

Speaking to The New York Times in 2013, Jeffrey Arnett of Clark University was critical of Twenge's research on narcissism among young people, stating: "I think she is vastly misinterpreting or over-interpreting the data, and I think it's destructive", and that her conclusions on narcissism among young people were not backed up by statistical analysis of teen behaviour. His criticisms of her work also included that she relies on the Narcissistic Personality Inventory (NPI), which Arnett claims is inherently flawed at measuring narcissism. Twenge has responded to this criticism by declaring of the NPI: "...it is employed in 77% of studies of narcissistic traits," and that it "...is also the best self-report predictor of narcissistic traits derived from clinical interviews." She also argued that "Documenting trends in young people's self-reported traits and attitudes is empirical research, not a complaint or a stereotype."

Publications 
Twenge's publications include:
The Narcissism Epidemic: Living in the Age of Entitlement
Generation Me
Social Psychology
Personality Psychology: Understanding Yourself and Others
The Impatient Woman's Guide to Getting Pregnant
iGen: Why Today's Super-Connected Kids Are Growing Up Less Rebellious, More Tolerant, Less Happy and Completely Unprepared for Adulthood

References

Living people
American women psychologists
21st-century American psychologists
San Diego State University faculty
University of Chicago alumni
University of Michigan alumni
1971 births
21st-century American women